Erkki Järvinen (15 October 1904 – 9 June 1991) was a Finnish athlete. He competed in the men's triple jump at the 1928 Summer Olympics.

References

1904 births
1991 deaths
Athletes (track and field) at the 1928 Summer Olympics
Finnish male triple jumpers
Olympic athletes of Finland
Place of birth missing